Adam Roberts (born 30 December 1991) is an English footballer playing as a midfielder for Leek Town.

Career
He made his debut for Macclesfield in the Football League Two game against Gillingham at Priestfield Stadium on 30 April 2011, which ended in a 4–2 win for Town. He came on as a late substitute for Colin Daniel.

In November 2010 he joined Northwich Victoria on a month's loan although his playing time at the club was limited postponements and then an injury. He rejoined the club for a second spell in February 2011.

In March 2012 he joined Leek Town on loan, and scored on his club debut against Romulus. In May 2012, Roberts was released by Macclesfield due to the expiry of his contract.

In November 2012, he re-joined Leek Town on a free transfer.

Club

References

External links

1991 births
Living people
English footballers
Association football midfielders
Macclesfield Town F.C. players
English Football League players
Leek Town F.C. players
Northern Premier League players
Northwich Victoria F.C. players